Roel Octavio Ramírez (born May 26, 1995) is a Mexican-American professional baseball pitcher in the Atlanta Braves organization of Major League Baseball (MLB). The Tampa Bay Rays selected him in the eighth round of the 2013 MLB draft. He made his MLB debut for the St. Louis Cardinals in 2020. He previously played for the Toros de Tijuana of the Mexican League.

Career

Tampa Bay Rays
Ramírez attended United South High School in Laredo, Texas. The Tampa Bay Rays selected him in the eighth round, with the 248th overall selection, of the 2013 MLB draft. He made his professional debut with the GCL Rays, where he recorded a 3-4 record and 5.86 ERA in 12 games. In 2014, Ramírez played for the rookie-level Princeton Rays, logging a 6-2 record and 1.86 ERA in 12 appearances. The following season, Ramírez played for the Low-A Hudson Valley Renegades, where he pitched to a 4-3 record and 2.97 ERA with 43 strikeouts in 69.2 innings pitched. For the 2016 season, Ramírez played for the Single-A Bowling Green Hot Rods, registering a 7-8 record and 4.68 ERA in 25 appearances. He split the 2017 season between the High-A Charlotte Stone Crabs and Bowling Green, accumulating a 3-3 record and 5.29 ERA with 60 strikeouts in 64.2 innings of work. Ramírez began the 2018 season with Charlotte, later receiving a promotion to the Double-A Montgomery Biscuits, where he logged a 3-1 record and 3.32 ERA in 26 games.

St. Louis Cardinals
On July 31, 2018, the Rays traded Ramírez, Justin Williams, and Génesis Cabrera to the St. Louis Cardinals in exchange for Tommy Pham and international signing bonus money. He finished the year with the Double-A Springfield Cardinals, where he logged a 5.06 ERA in 10 games. Ramírez split the 2019 season between Springfield and the Triple-A Memphis Redbirds, pitching to a cumulative 6-3 record and 4.78 ERA with 85 strikeouts in 75.1 innings pitched.

On August 5, 2020, Ramírez was selected to the 40-man roster and promoted to the major leagues for the first time. He made his MLB debut on August 16 against the Chicago White Sox, giving up four consecutive home runs to the Chicago White Sox. He was the ninth pitcher since at least 1901 to allow 4+ home runs in his major league debut, and the only one of those to allow the four home runs consecutively. On September 21, Ramírez was designated for assignment by the Cardinals. He re-signed with the Cardinals organization on a minor league contract on November 2. 

Ramírez was assigned to Triple-A Memphis to begin the 2021 season, where he posted a 4.67 ERA in 18 games. On June 28, 2021, Ramírez was selected to the active roster. Ramírez only appeared in 1 game for St. Louis, logging an 81.00 ERA, the same exact ERA he had posted the year previous.

New York Mets
On July 21, 2021, Ramírez was claimed off waivers by the New York Mets. Ramírez pitched in one game for the Triple-A Syracuse Mets, allowing 2 runs in an inning of work, before he was designated for assignment by the Mets on July 27. In 12 appearances for the Mets, Ramirez went 0-2 with a 8.31 ERA and 16 strikeouts. On October 4, Ramirez elected free agency.

Toros de Tijuana
On October 20, 2021, Ramírez signed with the Toros de Tijuana of the Mexican League.

Atlanta Braves
On July 6, 2022, Ramírez signed a minor league deal with the Atlanta Braves.

References

External links

1995 births
Living people
Baseball players from Texas
Bowling Green Hot Rods players
Charlotte Stone Crabs players
Glendale Desert Dogs players
Gulf Coast Rays players
Hudson Valley Renegades players
Major League Baseball pitchers
Memphis Redbirds players
Montgomery Biscuits players
People from Laredo, Texas
Princeton Rays players
Springfield Cardinals players
St. Louis Cardinals players
Surprise Saguaros players
Syracuse Mets players